The 2008–09 A1 Grand Prix of Nations, South Africa was an A1 Grand Prix race which was held at Kyalami, South Africa.

Pre-race
A1 Team Korea failed to participate the race as the organiser of the series could not supply electrical units and fuel tank due to mistake of the transportation from New Zealand. The team had planned the debut of 2008 Macau Grand Prix winner Keisuke Kunimoto (Lee Gyeong-Woo), a Japanese driver of Korean descent, as rookie driver on the weekend.

Drivers

Qualifying

Sprint Race

Feature Race

Post-race 
Following the race, the team principals of both Ireland and Malaysia issued statements regarding the on-track incident on the first lap of the Feature Race, which resulted in Ireland spinning out into retirement, and subsequently losing the championship lead to Switzerland.

Notes 
 It was the 37th race weekend (74 starts).
 It was the 4th race in South Africa but the first at Kyalami.
Records:
 It was the first ever pole position for  Monaco and Clivio Piccione.
 It was the first ever podium for  Monaco and Clivio Piccione.
  Switzerland's win in the feature race was driver Neel Jani's ninth in A1 Grand Prix, tying the record held by Nico Hülkenberg.
  Lebanon recorded the best finish in their history thanks to Daniel Morad's sixth in the feature race.

References

External links

A1 Grand Prix of Nations, South Africa, 2008–09
A1 Grand Prix